The 2014 Ivan Hlinka Memorial Tournament was an under-18 international ice hockey tournament held in Břeclav, Czech Republic and Piešťany, Slovakia, from August 11 to 16, 2014. It was the 11th time this tournament has been held in those two cities.

See also
2014 IIHF World U18 Championships
2014 World Junior Championships

References

Ivan Hlinka Memorial Tournament
2014
International ice hockey competitions hosted by Slovakia
International ice hockey competitions hosted by the Czech Republic
Ivan
Ivan